Acianthera decipiens is a species of orchid plant native to Costa Rica .

References 

decipiens
Flora of Costa Rica